I Dynasty  is a superyacht launched on 5 November 2014 at the German Kusch Yachts shipyard and delivered in the year 2015. She was built as Project V853. I Dynasty is built under project management of Vega Yachts, and is designed by The A Group, while Studio Massari is responsible for her interior.

Design 
The hull is built out of steel while the material of the superstructure is made out of Aluminium with teak laid decks. The yacht classed by Lloyd's Register and flagged in the Cayman Islands.

See also 
 Motor yacht
 List of motor yachts by length

References 

2014 ships
Motor yachts
Ships built in Germany